Francisco Ginella Dabezies (born 21 January 1999), commonly known as "Pancho" Ginella, is a Uruguayan professional footballer who plays as a midfielder for Nacional, on loan from Major League Soccer club Los Angeles FC.

Career

Montevideo Wanderers
A product of the club's youth academy, Ginella saw his first inclusion in the matchday squad in the form of three appearances among the substitutes at the end of the 2017 season. He wouldn't see inclusion in a match squad until 15 April 2018, the 12th matchday of the 2018 season, coming on as an 83rd minute substitute for Manuel Castro in a 3–2 victory over Racing Club, making his competitive debut in the process. After a week on the bench while the club fell 3–0 to River Plate, Ginella was awarded his first start against Cerro on April 28, playing the entirety of a 1–0 defeat. He made another start the following matchday against Liverpool in the final game of the Apertura, before going on to make three appearances during the Intermedio group stage against Racing Club, Liverpool, and Fénix as the club bowed out in the group stages. During the Clausura, Ginella would make just one appearance, a sixteen minute stint replacing Diego Riolfo in a 2–2 draw with Danubio.

Minutes were much more plentiful for Ginella in 2019, as he registered nearly four times as many as the year prior. He made eight appearances during the Apertura, seven of which were starts, up from three in 2018. During this time, in April, he would get his first taste of continental football in the form of a start in a Copa Sudamericana group stage match against Sport Huancayo which ended 1–1. Ginella would score his first competitive goal for the club in the first match of the Intermedio, a late consolation in a 2–1 defeat to Plaza Colonia. He registered a total of five appearances in the Intermedio, before playing a part in 12 matches during the Clausura campaign. In November 2018, Ginella and fellow Uruguayan Matías Viña were subject to interest from Inter Milan, with Ginella also being courted by Fiorentina. However, no offer was made by the club.

Los Angeles FC
In December 2019, Ginella was purchased by MLS club Los Angeles FC for $2.5 million, signing a four year contract. He made his debut for the club in LAFC's CONCACAF Champions League Round of 16 tie, playing the entirety of the away leg at Club León, which his side lost 2–0. Ginella also played a part, albeit much more subdued, in the second leg, registering seven minutes off the bench in place of Eduard Atuesta. Ginella made appearances in the club's first two MLS matches of the season as well, starting against Inter Miami and being subbed on against the Philadelphia Union. On October 11 2020, Ginella scored his first goal in a 3–1 win against the Seattle Sounders.

Nacional (loan)
On July 18, 2022, Ginella was loaned out to Uruguayan club Nacional for a 12-month long loan.

Personal life
Ginella holds both Uruguayan and Italian citizenship.

Career statistics

Honours
Nacional
Uruguayan Primera División: 2022

References

External links
Profile at Monteviedo Wanderers Official Website

1999 births
Living people
Uruguayan footballers
Uruguay youth international footballers
Uruguay under-20 international footballers
Association football midfielders
Montevideo Wanderers F.C. players
Los Angeles FC players
Club Nacional de Football players
Uruguayan Primera División players
Major League Soccer players